Julian Knight (born 4 March 1968) is an Australian mass murderer. On 9 August 1987, he shot seven people dead and injured 19 during a shooting spree in Clifton Hill, Victoria, Australia, in what became known as the Hoddle Street massacre.

Knight is serving seven concurrent sentences of life imprisonment with a non-parole period of 27 years. The judge who sentenced him, Justice George Hampel, stated that there were "a number of significant mitigatory factors" and "the fixing of a minimum term in this case is appropriate because of your age and your prospects of rehabilitation." The Crown prosecutor, Joe Dickson QC, "did not contend that a minimum term should not be fixed."

Knight is incarcerated in the maximum security Port Phillip Prison in Truganina near Melbourne. He would have been eligible for parole in 2014, until the Victorian government passed and approved of legislation which ensures that he is kept in jail until he dies, is in immediate danger of dying or is so incapacitated that he no longer poses a danger to others. Knight has challenged the validity of the legislation many times, but lost his final appeal to the High Court in August 2017.

Early life 

Julian Knight is the eldest of three children. He was adopted by a family with strong army ties when he was ten days old. Knight moved often as a child, living in Melbourne and Puckapunyal, and also abroad in Malaysia, Hong Kong and Singapore. In early 1975, Knight's family settled in Laverton, Victoria, and he attended Laverton Primary School until the end of 1978. His parents divorced in 1980 when he was 12. He then attended Westbourne Grammar School, Fitzroy High School and later Melbourne High School, a selective secondary school with entry by academic examination. An entry written by students in the 1985 Melbourne High School yearbook says: Julian 'Swapo' Knight inherited the role of "cadet unit looney and chief political agitator". While at Westbourne he was known for his fascination with guns and the military, with strong interests in Nazi Germany and World War II. In 1986, he attended La Trobe University to study French, German history and politics.

Military career 
Knight joined the Australian Army Cadets aged 14 and served in two cadet units, the Norwood High School Cadet Unit and the Melbourne HSCU. He later enlisted in the Army Reserve at the age of 17 while still in high school, serving as a trooper in the 4th/19th Prince of Wales's Light Horse Regiment, an armoured reconnaissance unit. Knight entered the Royal Military College, Duntroon on 13 January 1987, at the age of 18. While a military career had long been a dream, he performed poorly at studies and gained good results only in weapons expertise exercises. Knight was advised to leave the army after an incident in which he stabbed his superior, a sergeant, while drinking.

Hoddle Street massacre

On the evening of Sunday, 9 August 1987, Knight began firing his weapon multiple times in Hoddle Street in the Melbourne suburb of Clifton Hill. The shootings resulted in the deaths of seven people, and serious injury to nineteen others. After a police chase lasting more than thirty minutes, Knight was apprehended in nearby Fitzroy North and arrested for the shootings.

During the trial, it was asserted that Knight has a personality disorder with hysterical features. He was sentenced to seven concurrent terms of life imprisonment with a non-parole period of 27 years.

The Hoddle Street massacre has been the subject of several books, and two Australian TV documentaries: ABC TV's Hoddle Street (1988) and GTV Channel 9's Hoddle Street (2007).

Prison life 
Knight is an inmate in the mainstream section of the maximum security Port Phillip Prison near Melbourne. He has initiated many legal challenges to the Victorian government while imprisoned. Knight's challenges often concern events and occurrences arising during his imprisonment and his dissatisfaction with prison management and prison discipline. He has spent twelve years of his sentence in High Security management facilities.

Sentence 

On the 20th anniversary of the Hoddle Street massacre, the judge who sentenced Knight, Professor George Hampel, stood by the sentence he gave him.

Shortly before Knight became eligible for parole in 2014, the Victorian Parliament passed the Corrections Amendment (Parole) Act 2014 (Vic), which amended the Corrections Act 1986 (Vic) to prevent the parole board from ordering Knight's release "unless satisfied, amongst other things, that Mr Knight is in imminent danger of dying or is seriously incapacitated and that, as a result, he no longer has the physical ability to do harm to any person."

Legal challenges 
On 7 September 1992, Knight appeared before the Administrative Appeals Tribunal seeking a review of a decision where he was refused AUSTUDY assistance with his university studies while imprisoned. On 22 October 2001, Knight appeared before the Supreme Court of Victoria in his first Supreme Court case against the prison authorities, seeking an injunction ordering the return of documents prepared for the inquest into the death of a prisoner who had hanged himself in 2000. The documents were returned in court that day and the application was dismissed.

On 4 July 2002, Knight appeared before the Victorian Civil and Administrative Tribunal (VCAT) with a complaint regarding an abuse of human rights where prison officers removed items "of a political nature" from his cell. The items removed were a collection of business cards, pamphlets and sheets of paper. One sheet of the paper had a large picture of Adolf Hitler in uniform. A second had a picture of Hitler with Nazi insignia and skull and cross-bones, and others only the insignia. The cards featured slogans such as "Stop the Asian invasion", "We just hate all queers", "White power" and "Dial-a-racist" with contact details.

Along with the posters and paperwork, a large amount of contraband items were found in Knight's cell, such as blades, sharpened knives, white supremacist literature, war literature, medication bottles, a leather belt, two television remote controls, an extension lead, a can opener, bale hooks, permanent markers, computer disks many containing information relating to prison security and staff, pornographic material, sandpaper, masking tape, prison manuals, staff pictures, T.A.B. betting information, and prison and staff rosters. Knight's application was dismissed, even though many of the seized items were returned to him.

On 21 August 2002, Knight appeared before the Supreme Court of Victoria seeking an injunction ordering that prison management and staff cease inspecting and withholding legal mail sent to or by the plaintiff. The application was dismissed. On 2 September 2002, Knight appeared before VCAT seeking access to various prison documents under the Freedom of Information Act 1982 (Vic). On 9 September, Knight appeared before the VCAT seeking, "Full access to the daily staff rosters for HM Prison Barwon since the 1st May 2001" under the Freedom of Information Act. The application was affirmed.

On 7 October 2003, Knight appeared before the Supreme Court of Victoria seeking injunctions in regards to opening of private legal mail, prison disciplinary hearings, conditions in solitary confinement cells and Knight's security classification and imprisonment in Barwon Prison's high security Acacia wing. Supreme Court Judge Justice Philip Cummins said of Knight's application: "I consider that ordinary tax-payers should not be fixed with the burden of these proceedings. Accordingly, in each instance I order that the costs of the proceedings of the respective defendants be paid by the plaintiff." The application was dismissed. On 11 November 2003, Knight appeared before the Supreme Court of Victoria seeking an extension of time against a decision of VCAT. The application was dismissed with costs awarded against the applicant.

On 26 November 2013, Knight made a 94-page submission to the Defence Abuse Response Task Force (DART). In 2014, he initiated court proceedings in the ACT Supreme Court against the Commonwealth of Australia seeking damages for the bastardisation he allegedly suffered whilst at Duntroon.

Vexatious litigant 
In February 2003, it was estimated the many legal challenges by Knight had cost the Victorian government over A$250,000, and approximately $128,000 had been spent since October 2001 on external legal advice to deal with Knight's legal appeals and Freedom of Information requests.

On 19 October 2004, Knight was barred from launching any further legal action in Victoria's courts for ten years with a judge declaring him a vexatious litigant. He was the thirteenth person to be declared a vexatious litigant in Victoria since 1930, and the first prisoner. Knight is still able to make requests under the Freedom of Information Act. On 19 June 2008, Knight made a submission to the Victorian Parliament Law Reform Committee's Inquiry into Vexatious Litigants.

In June 2009, Knight sued Victorian Attorney-General Rob Hulls to force him to appear before the Supreme Court and to remove his status as a "vexatious litigant". He also claims the status "is being used as an instrument of oppression by Corrections Victoria" and says his request for access to a personal computer in his cell was denied.

Requests for rehabilitation 
On 26 June 2007, Knight told the Supreme Court of Victoria he wants access to rehabilitation programs in prison to improve his chance of parole. He also sought permission to write a letter of "apology and explanation" to one of his victims. The court heard prison authorities intercepted a letter Knight tried to send to one of his victims. He was charged with two prison offences and spent six days in solitary confinement. Knight told the court a letter of apology did not fit the prison guidelines for a prohibited letter, stating, "A letter of apology constitutes a facet of my rehabilitation and on a small measure of making amends for my actions," he told the court. Knight was given leave by the Court to proceed with his case.

See also
Martin Bryant
Port Arthur massacre
List of rampage killers

References

External links 
 R v Knight ; [1989] VR 705
 Re Julian Knight and Secretary to the Department of Employment, Education and Training 
 Knight v CORE 
 Knight v CORE 
 Knight v CORE 
 Knight v Minister for Corrections 
 Knight v State of Victoria 
 Mass killer Knight loses legal fight, The Age, 8 October 2003
 Hoddle Street mass killer faces court curb, The Age, 10 November 2003
 Even Julian Knight is entitled to basic human rights, The Age, 25 November 2003

1968 births
Living people
20th-century Australian criminals
Australian adoptees
Australian mass murderers
Australian spree killers
Australian people convicted of murder
Criminals from Melbourne
People convicted of murder by Victoria (Australia)
People educated at Melbourne High School
People with personality disorders
Prisoners sentenced to life imprisonment by Victoria (Australia)
Vexatious litigants
Australian prisoners sentenced to multiple life sentences
People from the City of Wyndham